Scotswood railway station served Scotswood in Newcastle upon Tyne, England. The railway station was located on the former route of the Newcastle and Carlisle Railway from Newcastle upon Tyne to Carlisle. The station opened in 1839 and closed in 1967.

History 
The South platforms (Blaydon line) had opened by May 1848; the North platforms (North Wylam loop) opened 12 July 1875. The South platform (Blaydon line) service was suspended on 3 September 1966 and the station closed to passengers on 1 May 1967. The buildings and platforms were demolished within five years.

Despite having platforms serving different lines (and, officially different companies at first), Scotswood was regarded as a single station. The northern pair of platforms on the Newburn line was added to the southern pair on the Newcastle–Blaydon line in 1875. Curving away from the original platforms, they were at a higher level, and ended some 50yds to the east.

The original station buildings burned down on 17 October 1879. By the mid-1880s new buildings, including waiting sheds, were completed, and the two sets of platforms were connected by bridge and subway. The new station building, at the east end of the southernmost platform, was a modest brick structure with a small awning. It was accompanied by a wooden pitched-roof building. A similar wooden structure accommodated office and waiting facilities on the opposite platform. Two further, equally unimposing, wooden buildings served the northern platforms.

The station was busy in its early years; in 1895 there were 144,462 tickets issued.  Usage declined after the 1930s as people chose to travel by bus instead. By 1951 only 17,180 tickets were issued to passengers. Services became infrequent in later years.

On 4 October 1982 passenger services ceased to use the Newcastle – Scotswood – Blaydon route. Trains were diverted from Newcastle West Junction over King Edward Bridge, then via Norwood Junction and Dunston to Blaydon. Tracks were removed from Scotswood Bridge and eastward beyond Elswick, leaving only a one-mile siding from Newcastle.

References

External links 

Railway stations in Great Britain opened in 1839
Railway stations in Great Britain closed in 1967
Disused railway stations in Tyne and Wear
Buildings and structures in Newcastle upon Tyne
Beeching closures in England
Scotswood
Transport in Newcastle upon Tyne
Former North Eastern Railway (UK) stations